Sanjiv M. Narayan is a British-born American physician, biomedical engineer, and academic researcher. He is a Professor of Medicine at Stanford University. Narayan's work is focused on treating patients with heart rhythm disorders, particularly those with atrial fibrillation. His research applies bioengineering and computational methods to develop improved diagnostic tools and therapy.

Narayan is a fellow of the American Heart Association; the American College of Cardiology, the Heart Rhythm Society, and the Royal College of Physicians of London. He is a Section Editor for Journal of the American College of Cardiology.

Education
Narayan completed his medical training in 1987 and his Masters in Computer Science in 1990 from the University of Birmingham, UK with a thesis on "Restricted Connectivity in Neural Networks". He received membership of the Royal College of Physicians (MRCP) that year. During post-doctoral research at the University of California, Los Angeles he developed systems and software to image and map intrinsic optical signals in rodent somatosensory cortex under Arthur W. Toga. Narayan completed residency in internal medicine at Mount Auburn Hospital/Harvard, fellowship in Cardiology and Cardiac Electrophysiology under Michael Cain and Bruce Lindsay at Barnes Hospital/Washington University.

Career
Narayan was faculty at University of California, San Diego from 2001-2014, and at the University of California, Los Angeles from 2012-2014. In 2014, Narayan joined Stanford University.

Research
Narayan’s research is focused at the intersection of clinical cardiac electrophysiology and bioengineering. From the late 1990s to early 2000s he studied tissue mechanisms for complex heart rhythm disorders by studying rate-dynamics of monophasic action potentials and conduction patterns in patients with atrial fibrillation, ventricular fibrillation and controls.

Narayan pioneered efforts for panoramic mapping of atrial fibrillation using global multipolar mapping catheters and artificial intelligence (AI) algorithms to separate physiological signals from noise. This work revealed localized drivers for AF, as targets for therapy.

His more recent work has focused on using AI to bridge basic arrhythmia mechanisms to patient care. He directs the Computational Arrhythmia Research Laboratory (CARL).

In 2022, Narayan was awarded the Distinguished Scientist Award of the Heart Rhythm Society.

Awards and honors
2022 – Distinguished Scientist Award, Heart Rhythm Society
2018 – Fellow, American Heart Association
2012 – Stephen Scheidt Visiting Professor, Cornell University
2012 – Richard Lewar Lecturer, University of Toronto
2008 – Fellow, Heart Rhythm Society
2006 – Fellow, American College of Cardiology
1994 – Fellow, Royal College of Physicians of London

Bibliography

Selected articles 
Narayan S.M, Bode F, Karasik PL, Franz MR. Alternans Of Atrial Action Potentials As A Precursor Of Atrial Fibrillation. Circulation 2002 106: 1968-1973.
Narayan SM, Krummen DE, Shivkumar K, Clopton PS, Rappel WJ, Miller JM. Treatment of Atrial Fibrillation by the Ablation of Localized Sources: The CONventional Ablation For Atrial Fibrillation With and Without Focal Impulse and Rotor Modulation (CONFIRM) Trial. J Am Coll Cardiol 2012; 60(7):628-36. Editorial PMID: 22818076 PMCID: PMC3416917
Rogers AJ, Selvalingam A, Alhusseini MI, Krummen DE, Corrado C, Abuzaid F, Baykaner T, Meyer C, Clopton P, Giles WR, Bailis P, Niederer SA, Wang PJ, Rappel WJ, Zaharia M, Narayan SM. Machine Learned Cellular Phenotypes in Cardiomyopathy Predict Sudden Death.  Circ Res 2021 128(2): 172-184.

References 

Living people
1964 births
Alumni of the University of Birmingham
Stanford University faculty